Hala Shukrallah (born in 1954) is the former president of the Egyptian Constitution Party, having succeeded Sayed Kassem as the party's leader. She is the first Coptic woman to head an Egyptian political party. As president of the Constitution Party, Hala Shukrallah had articulated as major goals the revitalization and expansion of the party, as well as the achievement of revolutionary objectives, such as repeal of the protest law, opposition to military domination of politics, and freedom for political prisoners. Her brother is Hani Shukrallah, who was the founder of Ahram Online.

References

Living people
Egyptian people of Coptic descent
Coptic politicians
21st-century Egyptian women politicians
21st-century Egyptian politicians
People of the Egyptian revolution of 2011
1954 births